is an Australian–Japanese speed skater who competed at the 2014 Winter Olympics for Japan.

He competed in the 5000 metres, where he finished 26th out of 26.

Williamson made his World Cup debut in November 2013. As of September 2014, Williamson's best World Cup finish is 11th, in a 5000 m B race in 2013–14. His best overall finish in the World Cup is 46th, in the 2013–14 5000 and 10000 m.

He is a member of the Nidec Sankyo speed skating team.

References

External links

1995 births
Japanese male speed skaters
Speed skaters at the 2014 Winter Olympics
Speed skaters at the 2018 Winter Olympics
Olympic speed skaters of Japan
Sportspeople from Hokkaido
Living people
Japanese people of Australian descent
Asian Games medalists in speed skating
Speed skaters at the 2017 Asian Winter Games
Asian Games silver medalists for Japan
Medalists at the 2017 Asian Winter Games
World Single Distances Speed Skating Championships medalists